Events in the year 1716 in Norway.

Incumbents
Monarch: Frederick IV

Events
Great Northern War: 
9 Mars - Battle of Høland.
April - The forces of Charles XII of Sweden briefly occupy Christiania.
4 July - Fredrikshald is set on fire by its inhabitants as to prevent the city being taken by the forces of King Charles XII.
8 July - Battle of Dynekilen.

Arts and literature

Births

Deaths

19 February – Dorothe Engelbretsdotter, hymn and poem writer (born 1634).

See also

References